Nahavaq, also known as South West Bay (Malekula) or Siesip, is one of the many languages of the Malekula Coast group of Vanuatu.

References

External links  
 ELAR archive of Nahavaq language documentation materials.
 Paradisec has a number of collections that include Nahavaq language materials

Malekula languages
Languages of Vanuatu